Jill Boltz (née Hunter, born 14 October 1966) is an English former distance runner who represented Great Britain at the 1988 Seoul Olympics and the 1992 Barcelona Olympics. She won a silver medal in the 10,000 metres at the 1990 Commonwealth Games. In 1991, she broke the World Best for 10 miles, with 51:41 in New York City. She also twice won the AAA Championships 10,000 metres title (1989, 1995).

Career
Hunter was born in Hexham, Northumberland, England and was a member of Blaydon Harriers Athletics Club and later Valli Harriers. She first came to prominence as a cross-country runner, finishing second to Angela Tooby at the 1988 UK world cross country trial, ahead of Zola Budd. At the 1988 World Cross Country Championships in Auckland she made the top ten, finishing ninth. In August, she finished second behind Yvonne Murray at the AAA Championships in the 3000 metres in 8:51.51, earning Olympic selection. Two weeks later, she ran her best ever 3000 metres at the Zurich Grand Prix, running 8:47.36. At the Seoul Olympics in September, she was eliminated in her heat, running 8:57.28

Hunter finished in the top ten at both the 1989 IAAF World Cross Country Championships in Stavanger and the 1989 World 15km Road Race Championships in Rio de Janeiro, placing seventh and sixth respectively. That year, she also won the AAAs National title at 10,000 metres, to earn Commonwealth selection for England. At the 1990 Commonwealth Games in Auckland in January, she won the silver medal behind Scotland's Liz McColgan. Later that year, she finished eighth in the 10,000 metres final at the European Championships in Split.

Hunter had perhaps the best year of her career in 1991. In April, she broke Cathy O'Brien's  10 mile World Best on the roads, with 51:41 in New York City. In June, at the European Cup in Frankfurt, she ran her lifetime best 10,000 m with 31:07.88, to finish second behind Kathrin Ullrich who ran 31:03.62. This performance moved her to fifth on the world all-time list at the time. In July she ran 48:19 for 15 km on the roads, which at the time, ranked her sixth on the world all-time list. As the world's number three (after McColgan and Ullrich) she was a serious medal contender in the 10,000 metres at the World Championships in Tokyo, however she struggled in the humid conditions and finished ninth in the final in 32:24.55

In 1992, Hunter achieved her third top ten finish at the World Cross Country Championships, finishing eighth in Boston. In the summer, she ran her career best 5000 metres with 15:09.98 in Hechtel. Then in August, at the Barcelona Olympics, she finished 10th in the 10,000 metres final in 31:46.49. After struggling with injuries, Hunter returned to win her second AAAs 10,000 m title in 1995 and earn selection for the World Championships in Gothenburg, where she finished 15th in the 10,000 metres final.

As of 2022, Hunter ranks seventh on the UK all-time list for 10,000 m  (31:07 in 1991),  11th on the 10 km road (31.42 in 1989) and eighth on the 15 km road (48:19 in 1991), while her 10-mile road best (51:41 in 1991) still ranks third on the UK all-time list, with Paula Radcliffe and Eilish McColgan being the only British women to have gone faster.

Personal life
Hunter married Danny Boltz, a Swiss-born Australian distance runner, who represented Switzerland at the 1992 Barcelona Olympics in the Marathon.

National titles
AAAs National 10,000 metres Champion (1989, 1995)

International competitions

Notes:
(h) Indicates overall position achieved in qualifying round.
(#) indicates superior time achieved in qualifying round.

References

1966 births
Living people
English female long-distance runners
Olympic athletes of Great Britain
Athletes (track and field) at the 1988 Summer Olympics
Athletes (track and field) at the 1992 Summer Olympics
Commonwealth Games silver medallists for England
Athletes (track and field) at the 1990 Commonwealth Games
Commonwealth Games medallists in athletics
Medallists at the 1990 Commonwealth Games